The Laboratory of design, manufacturing and control (in ), also known as the LCFC, is a French laboratory of research located in Metz. It is under the authority of Arts et Métiers ParisTech. It is part of the Carnot Institute ARTS and currently employs more than 30 persons. It was created in 2009 from the division of the LGIPM, a laboratory specialized in industrial design and manufacturing. It is also part of the doctoral school 432 of Arts et Métiers ParisTech.

Teaching and research topics 

The main part of the research is focused on the following lines:

Control of complex robots 
Development of innovative processes and manufacturing methods
Methods for decision taking and design

Projects 

Since 2012, the LCFC is part of the project BioCapTech and contribute to the design of new water treatment systems. 
The joint venture with the Agence nationale de la recherche aims to design a new humanoid robot, nicknamed Hydroid.
The laboratory is also implied in the projet Corousso, focused on the friction stir welding process.

Facilities and equipment 

The LCFC is one of the user of the Cassiopé computer cluster, along with the Arts et Métiers ParisTech and the University of Lorraine.

Locations 

 CIRAM, center of research in Metz Science Park
 Metz campus of Arts et Métiers ParisTech

References and notes 

Laboratories of Arts et Métiers ParisTech
Laboratories in France
French National Centre for Scientific Research